Montgomery High School may refer to:
Mary G. Montgomery High School in Semmes, Alabama
Montgomery High School (Brownville, AL)
Montgomery High School, Blackpool in Blackpool, England
Montgomery High School (San Diego) in San Diego, California
Montgomery High School (Santa Rosa, California)
Montgomery High School (Louisiana) in Montgomery, Louisiana
Montgomery High School (New Jersey) in Skillman, New Jersey
Montgomery High School (Montgomery, Pennsylvania) in Montgomery, Pennsylvania
Montgomery High School (Montgomery, Texas) in Montgomery, Texas
Montgomery Catholic Preparatory School in Montgomery, Alabama
Bishop Montgomery High School in Torrance, California
Richard Montgomery High School in Rockville, Maryland
Montgomery Blair High School in Silver Spring, Maryland
Montgomery - Lonsdale High School in Montgomery, Minnesota
East Montgomery High School in Biscoe, North Carolina
Eastern Montgomery High School in Elliston, Virginia
West Montgomery High School in Mount Gilead, North Carolina

See also
Montgomery Academy (disambiguation)
Montgomery County High School (disambiguation)